Sluda is the name of several rural localities in Russia:
Sluda, Kotlas, Arkhangelsk Oblast, a village under the administrative jurisdiction of the town of oblast significance of Kotlas, Arkhangelsk Oblast
Sluda, Pinezhsky District, Arkhangelsk Oblast, a village in Sursky Selsoviet of Pinezhsky District of Arkhangelsk Oblast
Sluda, Verkhnetoyemsky District, Arkhangelsk Oblast, a village in Puchuzhsky Selsoviet of Verkhnetoyemsky District of Arkhangelsk Oblast
Sluda, Kostroma Oblast, a village in Povalikhinskoye Settlement of Chukhlomsky District of Kostroma Oblast
Sluda, Vladimir Oblast, a village in Yuryev-Polsky District of Vladimir Oblast
Sluda, Shestakovsky Selsoviet, Kichmengsko-Gorodetsky District, Vologda Oblast, a village in Shestakovsky Selsoviet of Kichmengsko-Gorodetsky District of Vologda Oblast
Sluda, Shongsky Selsoviet, Kichmengsko-Gorodetsky District, Vologda Oblast, a village in Shongsky Selsoviet of Kichmengsko-Gorodetsky District of Vologda Oblast
Sluda, Nikolsky District, Vologda Oblast, a village in Zelentsovsky Selsoviet of Nikolsky District of Vologda Oblast
Sluda, Tarnogsky District, Vologda Oblast, a village in Shevdenitsky Selsoviet of Tarnogsky District of Vologda Oblast
Sluda, Totemsky District, Vologda Oblast, a village in Medvedevsky Selsoviet of Totemsky District of Vologda Oblast